Zelal Baturay (born 7 July 1996) is a Turkish women's football forward currently playing in the Women's Super League for Fatih Vatan Spor with jersey number 21. She is a member of the Turkey women's national U-19 team.

Club career 

Zelal Baturay was discovered by Filiz Atay, the female manager of the women's football team Diyarbakır Büyükşehir Belediyespor, renamed later to Amed Sportif Faaliuetler, as she was playing football with boys on the street in Diyarbakır. Atay was hard put to persuade her parents for Baturay's football playing.

She obtainer her license on 7 April 2011 for her hometown club Diyarbakır Büyükşehir Belediyespor. After playing three seasons in the Second League, at which she scored 84 goals in 30 games, she was transferred by Gazikentspor of Gaziantep in the 2014–15 season to play in the Women's First League.

In the 2012–13 season, Zelal Baturay became top scorer of the Second League's Division of Southeast Anatolia-Mediterranean Region with 33 goals in 10 matches.

After three seasons with her hometown club Diyabakır B.B. Spor in the Second League, she transferred to Gazikentspor of Gaziantep in the 2014–15 season, which was newly promoted to the First League. With her team's relegation in the 2015–16 season, she moved to the Third-League team Maraşgücü Spor in Kahramanmaraş. In the 2016–17 season, Baturay returned to her hometown to play for Amed S.K. in the Second League.

In the second half of the 2019–20 Women's First League season, Baturay moved to the Istanbul-based club Fatih Vatan Spor. In the 3030–21 season, her team became runner-up losing to Beşiktaş J.K. in the play-off final match. She was honored with award of Top goalscorer netting seven goals in the all six natches of the season.

International career 
Baturay was called up to the Tırkey women's national U-19 team, and debuted in the friendly match against Azerbaijan on 26 November 2013. She took part at the 2015 UEFA Women's Under-19 Championship qualification – Group 4 matches, and scored one goal. Baturay capped 11 times and scored 4 goals so far for the national U-19 team.

Career statistics 
.

Honours

Club 
 Turkish Women's First League
 Fatih Vatan Spor
 Runners-up (1): 2020–21

Individual 
Top goalscorer: 2020–21 with Fatih Vatan Spor

References

External links 

1996 births
Living people
People from Eğil
Turkish women's footballers
Women's association football forwards
Gazikentspor players
Amed S.K. (women) players
Fatih Vatan Spor players
Turkish Women's Football Super League players